The Battle of Rauge was a battle that took place on 15 September 1701 near Rõuge, Livonia during the Great Northern War in which the Swedes defeated the numerically superior Russians.

References

Rauge
Rauge
1701 in Russia
1701 in Sweden
Swedish Livonia
Rõuge Parish
18th century in Estonia
Rauge
Rauge
Battles in Estonia